Aslan Akhmetovich Dzeytov (born 13 August 1990) is a Russian former professional football player.

Club career
He played 2 seasons in the Russian Football National League for FC Chernomorets Novorossiysk and FC Angusht Nazran.

External links
 
 

1990 births
Living people
Russian footballers
Association football midfielders
FC Chernomorets Novorossiysk players
FC Angusht Nazran players